The Airborne Outback is an Australian two-seat flying wing ultralight trike that was designed and produced by Airborne Windsports in the mid-2000s.

Design and development
The Outback was developed as an off-airport aircraft, with a carriage that lacks a fairing and other encumbrances to "all-terrain" operations. It features a cable-braced hang glider-style high-wing, weight-shift controls, a two-seat, open cockpit, tricycle landing gear and a single engine in pusher configuration.

The aircraft single surface Wizard model wing is made from bolted-together aluminium tubing, covered in Dacron sailcloth. Its  span wing is supported by a single tube-type kingpost and uses an "A" frame control bar. The landing gear has optional tundra tires. The aircraft has demonstrated operations from sand dunes.

The basic Outback model was later developed into the Airborne XT series that still dominates the company's product line in 2012.

Specifications (Outback)

References

2000s Australian ultralight aircraft
Homebuilt aircraft
Single-engined pusher aircraft
Ultralight trikes